Ammonium propionate or ammonium propanoate is the ammonium salt of propionic acid. It has the chemical formula NH4(C2H5COO).

Reaction 
It is formed by the reaction of propionic acid and ammonia.

Uses 
It is used in several products, which include: fertilizers, water treatment chemicals, and plant protection products. It is also used in different areas, such as: manufacturing, forestry, agriculture, and fishing.

It also serves as an antiseptic, antifungal agent, antimould agent, and preservative in feed industry or food industry.

Ammonium propionate also prevents spoilage of cosmetics by preventing bacterial growth.

See also 

 Calcium propionate
 Potassium propionate
 Sodium propionate

References 

Ammonium compounds